Joy is a 2015 American biographical comedy-drama film, written and directed by David O. Russell and starring Jennifer Lawrence as Joy Mangano, a self-made millionaire who created her own business empire.

Joy received a theatrical release on December 25, 2015, distributed by 20th Century Fox. It received mixed reviews from critics, who praised Lawrence's performance but criticized the writing and pace of the film. Lawrence received a nomination for the Academy Award for Best Actress and won the Golden Globe Award for Best Actress – Motion Picture Musical or Comedy for her performance. Joy was also nominated for the Golden Globe Award for Best Motion Picture – Musical or Comedy, among other accolades.

Plot
In 1990, Joy Mangano, an airline booking agent residing in Peconic, New York, struggles financially while juggling a complicated family life. Living with Joy and her two children are her single mother, Terri, who spends all day in bed watching soap operas, her maternal grandmother, Mimi, and her under-employed ex-husband, Tony, a wannabe singer who sleeps in the basement. Her overachieving paternal half-sister, Peggy, constantly humiliates Joy in front of her children for her failed marriage. Joy's father, Rudy, further complicates matters when he also moves into the basement after his third divorce.

Mimi and Joy's best friend, Jackie, encourage Joy to pursue her inventing ambitions. Frustrated when using a conventional mop, Joy designs and builds an innovative self-wringing type. Trudy, a wealthy Italian widow Rudy is dating, agrees to invest in Joy's product. They contract with a California company to manufacture the mop's parts at a low price. To avoid a potential patent lawsuit, the company advises Joy to pay $50,000 in royalties to a man in Hong Kong who has a similar product. When the manufacturer repeatedly bills Joy to remake their faulty parts, Joy refuses to pay.

Joy meets QVC executive Neil Walker who agrees to sell her mops on TV. To manufacture 50,000 additional units, Joy takes out a second home mortgage. When the first TV attempt fails after the celebrity pitchman improperly demonstrates the product, Joy demands she be allowed to do a second infomercial. The mop sells out, earning thousands of dollars; Joy's success is soon tempered by Mimi's sudden death.

Joy's fledgling business is financially jeopardized after Peggy pays the manufacturer's excessive overcharges without Joy's approval. The manufacturer refuses to refund the money, and a contract loophole allows them to fraudulently patent Joy's mop design as their own. Shortly after filing for bankruptcy, Joy discovers there never was a similar product in Hong Kong, and the manufacturer has defrauded her. She confronts owner Derek Markham, forcing him to refund the overcharges, pay damages, and relinquish any claim to her patent or else face criminal charges.

Joy becomes a successful independent businesswoman who sponsors other inventors. Jackie and Tony are her most valued advisers. Joy supports her aging father, despite his and Peggy's unsuccessful lawsuit for ownership of her company. Only Terri is independent, having found stability with Toussaint, a Haitian plumber Joy once hired. As Neil predicted, he and Joy became "adversaries in commerce" with her move to HSN, but they remain personal friends.

Cast

Production

Writing and casting
In January 2014, it was announced that David O. Russell's upcoming project would entail rewriting and directing a drama film about American inventor and entrepreneur Joy Mangano, a struggling Long Island single mom of three children. Russell set Jennifer Lawrence to play the lead role in the film, which John Davis and John Fox produced for Davis Entertainment, along with Ken Mok, with 20th Century Fox holding the distribution rights. In early November 2014, Russell said it was "a great opportunity to do something neither Jennifer nor I have done [before]". He also stated that he would like to cast Robert De Niro and create a role for Bradley Cooper to star in the film. On November 11, it was reported that De Niro was in final talks to re-team with Russell and Lawrence in the film, to play Mangano's father. They worked together in the 2012 film Silver Linings Playbook, and then De Niro made a cameo in 2013's American Hustle. Russell rewrote the script by Annie Mumolo. On November 17, De Niro confirmed his casting, saying "Yes I am going to do something with them. I am going to play a father." In early December 2014, Cooper was officially set to star along with Lawrence, playing an executive at QVC who helps Joy by giving the Miracle Mop a boost. On December 8, Édgar Ramírez was cast as Tony Miranda, Joy's now ex-husband. Additional cast members, including Isabella Rossellini, Diane Ladd, and Virginia Madsen in unspecified roles, were revealed on February 17, 2015. Isabella Crovetti-Cramp played young Joy. In February, another working title was revealed, which was Kay's Baptism. Elisabeth Röhm's casting as Peggy, sister of Joy Mangano, was revealed on February 27, 2015.

Filming
Principal photography began in February 2015, after De Niro completed the shooting of Dirty Grandpa. Filming was originally set to begin on February 9, 2015, in Boston, Massachusetts, making this Russell's third film shot in the area. Due to snow in the city, filming was rescheduled to begin on February 19, on Federal Street in Wilmington, MA, lasting through February 26, but principal photography on the film began in Boston on February 16, 2015.

In Wilmington, filming lasted until February 26, 2015. On February 27, 2015, Lawrence made a Facebook post denying the rumors about her clashes with Russell on the set of the film, saying, "David O. Russell is one of my closest friends and we have an amazing collaborative working relationship. I adore this man and he does not deserve this tabloid malarkey. This movie is going great and I'm having a blast making it!" After wrapping up in Wilmington, the production moved to North Reading, where shooting took place March 2–4, 2015 and on March 11 and 12.

Release
The film was released on December 25, 2015.

Home Media
Joy was released on DVD, Blu-ray, and Ultra HD Blu-ray on May 3, 2016 by 20th Century Fox Home Entertainment.

Reception

Box office

Joy grossed $56.4 million in the U.S. and Canada and $44.7 million in other countries, for a worldwide total of $101.1 million against a budget of $60 million.

In the United States and Canada, the film opened on December 25, 2015 alongside Point Break, Daddy's Home, and Concussion, as well as the wide release of The Big Short. In its opening weekend, it was projected to gross $13–15 million from 2,896 theaters. It ended up grossing $17 million, finishing third at the box office behind Star Wars: The Force Awakens ($149.2 million) and Daddy's Home ($38.7 million).

Critical response
Joy received mixed reviews from critics. On the review aggregator website Rotten Tomatoes, the film has an approval rating of 60%, based on 275 reviews, with an average rating of 6.3/10. The site's consensus reads, "Joy is anchored by a strong performance from Jennifer Lawrence, although director David O. Russell's uncertain approach to its fascinating fact-based tale only sporadically sparks bursts of the titular emotion." On Metacritic, the film has a weighted average score of 56 out of 100, based on 48 critics, indicating "mixed or average reviews". Audiences polled by CinemaScore gave the film an average grade of "B+" on an A+ to F scale.

Accolades

References

Further reading
 David O. Russell, Joy, Faber & Faber, 2015.

External links
 
 
 
 
 

2015 films
2010s English-language films
2015 biographical drama films
2015 comedy films
2015 comedy-drama films
20th Century Fox films
American biographical drama films
American business films
American comedy-drama films
Annapurna Pictures films
Biographical films about businesspeople
Films about women in the United States
Davis Entertainment films
Drama films based on actual events
Films about dysfunctional families
Films about interracial romance
Films about single parent families
Films directed by David O. Russell
Films featuring a Best Musical or Comedy Actress Golden Globe winning performance
Films produced by John Davis
Films produced by Megan Ellison
Films scored by West Dylan Thordson
Films set in Dallas
Films set in Long Island
Films set in New Jersey
Films set in New York City
Films set in Pennsylvania
Films set in the 1970s
Films set in the 1980s
Films set in the 1990s
Films shot in Boston
Films shot in Massachusetts
TSG Entertainment films
2010s American films